Bandvagn 206 (Bv 206) (meaning "Tracked Vehicle 206" in English) is a tracked articulated, all-terrain carrier developed by Hägglunds (now part of BAE Systems Platforms & Services) for the Swedish Army. It consists of two units, with all four tracks powered. It can carry up to 17 people (6 in the front compartment, 11 in the rear), and the trailer unit can be adapted for different uses (see Variants section).

History

Development of the Bv 206 all-terrain articulated tracked carrier began in 1974. Three batches of trial vehicles were delivered between 1976 and 1978 and the first production examples were delivered to the Swedish Defense Administration in 1980.

Like its predecessor, the Volvo Bv 202, the Bv 206 is designed to carry troops and equipment through snow and bog-lands in northern Sweden. The low ground pressure enables the Bv 206 to cope with a wide range of difficult conditions. Over 11,000 have been produced and they are used in more than 37 countries worldwide.

The Bv 206 is referred to as a Small Unit Support Vehicle (SUSV) pronounced "susvee" in United States service. U.S. military variants include the standard model (M973), a tactical operations center variant (M1065), an ambulance variant (M1066) and a flat-bed cargo carrier (M1067). U.S. military models are fitted with a 6-cylinder Mercedes diesel engine and a non-halon fire suppression system since 1997 due to several cases where the front car caught fire and burned to the frame.

Users include the American and Australian Antarctic research organizations and British, Icelandic and Canadian search and rescue services. They are also used for search and rescue services in the Austrian alpine region. The Bv 206 was used in combat by the Canadian Army during Operation Anaconda. The Singapore Armed Forces uses the Bv 206, and recently transferred several of them to the Singapore Civil Defense Force for use as a firefighting platform.

Decommissioned units have been purchased by private owners and rented as transports, particularly in Alberta, Canada, to access remote oil wells, as well as cut blocks which need to be reforested by tree planting.

The Bv 206 is used in Antarctica, Brazil, Canada, Chile, China, Estonia, Finland, France, Germany, Greece, Ireland, Israel, Indonesia, Italy, Lithuania, Latvia, Malaysia, Mexico, the Netherlands, New Zealand, Norway, Pakistan, Singapore, South Korea, Spain, Sweden, the United Kingdom, and the United States.

Variants

Bv 206A

The Bv 206A is an ambulance version, which is capable of carrying stretchers in the rear compartment.

Bv 206F
The Bv 206F is a fire appliance variant.

RaBv 2061
The RaBv 2061 (RadioBandvagn 2061) is a Swedish Army communications/command version, fitted with radio equipment and workplaces for staff members.

PvBv 2062
The PvBv 2062 (PansarvärnsBandvagn 2062) is a Swedish Army anti-tank vehicle, an open top version of the Bv 206 armed with a 90 mm Pvpj 1110 recoilless anti-tank gun.

PvBv 2063
The PvBv 2063 (PansarvärnsBandvagn 2063) is another Swedish Army anti-tank vehicle, similar to PvBv 2062, but fitted with the launch system for an ATGM, either the TOW (Rbs 55) or the Bofors BILL (Rbs 56).

Bv 206S

The Bv 206S is an armoured personnel carrier variant of the Bv 206, which provides protection from small arms fire for the occupants. It is in service with the armed forces of France, Germany (379 Bv 206D/S ordered), Spain, Netherlands, Italy (158 units), Sweden (50 units), Greece (Bv 208) and Singapore (300 units), which has replaced it with the Bronco All Terrain Tracked Carrier.

Using a Steyr M1-"Monoblock" engine (6-cylinder, 130 kW), the vehicle can carry the driver and 12 combat-equipped troops — four in the front compartment and eight in the rear. The Bv 206S can be underslung and airlifted by Boeing CH-47 Chinook and Sikorsky CH-53E Super Stallion helicopters or carried in the C130 Hercules airplane, amongst others.

Canadian troops taking part in Operation Anaconda in Afghanistan made good use of this vehicle, riding over rough mountainous terrain with full combat gear, allowing the men to avoid the exhaustion they would have felt moving on foot at such high altitudes and in such conditions.

The UK is looking to replace its Bv206Ds by 2020.

GAZ-3351 
Produced in Russia under license from Hägglunds by the GAZ Group at the Zavolzhsky Plant Of Caterpillar Tractors. Uses a 6-cylinder Steyr M16 turbodiesel engine.

BvS 10

The BvS 10, not to be confused with the Bv 206 or Bv 206S, is a much larger (therefore equipped with a 6-cylinder Steyr M1 engine with 200 kW) but still fully amphibious armoured vehicle based upon the characteristic twin-cab, articulated steering system typical of Hägglunds all terrain vehicles. It was originally designed for the British Royal Marines Commandos and named All Terrain Vehicle (Protected) - ATV(P) VIKING. It is in service with the Royal Marines Armoured Support Group and the Royal Netherlands Marine Corps while the French Army have recently ordered 130 Bvs10s. The Austrian Armed Forces 32 BvS10AUT represents the most modern variant with full vehicle and crew protection and a .50 calibre remote-controlled weapon station. It is also planned for the Italian Army.

BvS 10 Beowulf 
The BvS 10 Beowulf is essentially an unarmored version of the BvS 10 Viking.

Other variants
Other variants exist including mortar carrier, cargo carrier, fuel carrier, radar, command post and radio relay. The units can easily be customized to meet customer requirements.

Specifications (original version)

 Engine: 2.8L 99 kW Ford Cologne V6.
 Gearbox: MB W 4A-018 automatic transmission
 Weight: 
 Length: 
 Width: 
 Height:

Operators

Current operators
  Argentine National Gendarmerie
  Austrian Armed Forces
  Brazilian Marine Corps
  Canadian Army – (78)
  Chilean Marine Corps
  Estonian Defence Forces
  Finnish Army
  French Army
  German Army
  Hellenic Army – Used with ARTHUR counterbattery radar.
  Indonesian Army — Used by 2nd Group of the Kopassus special forces.
  Irish Defence Forces – (7) Fitted with GIRAFFE Mk IV radars.
  Israel Defense Forces
  Italian Army (about 110 BV-206; 112 BV-206S7 and 46 BV-206S)
  Latvian Land Forces
  Lithuanian Land Force
  Malaysian Army - (80)
  Netherlands Navy
  Norwegian Army – (1000)
  Singapore Army
  South Korean Army
  Spanish Army
  Swedish Army – (4,500) Includes BvS 10 variant
  British Armed Forces
  United States Armed Forces – Used in the United States Army by the 86th Infantry Brigade Combat Team, the 4th Brigade Combat Team (Airborne) and 1st Stryker Brigade Combat Team, 25th Infantry Division. Also used by the United States Marine Corps.
  United States National Guard

Civilian operators
  Ministry of Emergency Situations of Armenia
  New South Wales Ambulance
  Low Impact Inc.
  Red Deer County Technical Rescue Task Force
  Four Tracks All-Terrain Edmonton Alberta
  LEGOLAND Billund
  Estonian Rescue Board
  Hellenic Fire Service
  Icelandic Association for Search and Rescue
  Mobile Brigade Corps of Indonesian National Police
  Indonesian Red Cross
  Civil Defence Ireland
  Italian National Firefighters Corps
  New Zealand Antarctic Research Programme
  Several hundred ex-Norwegian sold and believed to have ended up in Russia.
  Royal National Lifeboat Institution
  Bay Search and Rescue Team
  Greater Manchester Fire and Rescue Service
  Massachusetts State Police
  Schlumberger
  South Metro Fire Rescue in Parker, CO in the south part of Denver metropolitan area at Station 46.

See also
Similar vehicles with the Bv206 ATV include:

 Sisu Auto Sisu Nasu
 ST Kinetics Bronco All Terrain Tracked Carrier
 Hägglunds (BAE Systems AB) BvS 10
 Bolinder-Munktell (Volvo BM) Bandvagn 202
 World War II Germany's Raupenschlepper Ost

References

External links

 (previously Alvis Hägglunds, before that Hägglunds Vehicle, and in the very beginning Hägglund & Söner)

Tracked amphibious vehicles
Snowmobiles
Military vehicles of Sweden
Royal National Lifeboat Institution launch vehicles
Two-section tracked all-terrain vehicles
Military vehicles introduced in the 1980s